In April 2013, the Bonaire Football Federation was granted associate membership in CONCACAF and was promoted to full membership in June 2014. Bonaire also became a full member of the Caribbean Football Union in 2013.

These are the official fixtures, results, and statistics of the Bonaire national football team after being accepted into CONCACAF. Unofficial internationals played by the team before obtaining CONCACAF membership are not included.

Overview of results

International matches

2013 ABCS Tournament

2014 Caribbean Cup qualification

2015 ABCS Tournament

2019–20 CONCACAF Nations League qualification

2019–20 CONCACAF Nations League

2021 ABCS Tournament

2022–23 CONCACAF Nations League

2022 ABCS Tournament

Record versus other nations
As of 6 June 2022, includes only matches against senior national teams after CONCACAF acceptance

References

Results